Piotr Łukasz Gruszka (born 8 March 1977) is a Polish professional volleyball coach and former player. He was a member of the Poland national team from 1995 to 2011. A participant in the Olympic Games (Atlanta 1996, Athens 2004, Beijing 2008), and the 2009 European Champion.

Personal life
Piotr Gruszka was born in Oświęcim, but raised in Kęty. He is married to Aleksandra (née Szettel). They have two children: daughter Maria Aleksandra (born 26 August 2005) and son named Julian (born 1 March 2010).

In 2014, he took part in the 14th season of Polish version of Dancing with the Stars. His pro dancer was Nina Tyrka. They were eliminated as 8th couple and took 5th place.

Career

National team
Piotr Gruszka was a member of the Polish national team that won a silver medal at the 2006 World Championship. In 2009, Gruszka won a gold medal of the European Championship, where he was named the Most Valuable Player. On 14 September 2009, he was awarded the Knight's Cross of Polonia Restituta. The Order was conferred on the following day by the Prime Minister of Poland, Donald Tusk. With his national team, he won two bronze medals in 2011: of the 2011 World League and 2011 European Championship.

Honours

Clubs
 CEV Challenge Cup
  2008/2009 – with Arkas İzmir

 National championships
 1994/1995  Polish Championship, with AZS Częstochowa
 1996/1997  Polish Championship, with AZS Częstochowa
 1997/1998  Polish Cup, with AZS Częstochowa
 2004/2005  Polish Cup, with PGE Skra Bełchatów
 2004/2005  Polish Championship, with PGE Skra Bełchatów
 2006/2007  Polish Cup, with PGE Skra Bełchatów
 2006/2007  Polish Championship, with PGE Skra Bełchatów
 2007/2008  Polish Championship, with PGE Skra Bełchatów
 2008/2009  Turkish Cup, with Arkas İzmir

Youth national team
 1996  CEV U20 European Championship
 1997  FIVB U21 World Championship

Individual awards
 2003: CEV European Championship – Best Spiker
 2009: CEV European Championship – Most Valuable Player

State awards
 2006:  Gold Cross of Merit
 2009:  Knight's Cross of Polonia Restituta

References

External links

 
 
 Player profile at LegaVolley.it 
 Player profile at PlusLiga.pl  
 
 
 Coach/Player profile at Volleybox.net

1977 births
Living people
People from Oświęcim
Polish men's volleyball players
Polish volleyball coaches
Volleyball coaches of international teams
Olympic volleyball players of Poland
Volleyball players at the 1996 Summer Olympics
Volleyball players at the 2004 Summer Olympics
Volleyball players at the 2008 Summer Olympics
Recipients of the Gold Cross of Merit (Poland)
Knights of the Order of Polonia Restituta
Polish expatriate sportspeople in Italy
Expatriate volleyball players in Italy
Polish expatriate sportspeople in France
Expatriate volleyball players in France
Polish expatriate sportspeople in Turkey
Expatriate volleyball players in Turkey
BBTS Bielsko-Biała players
AZS Częstochowa players
Skra Bełchatów players
AZS Olsztyn players
Arkas Spor volleyball players
BKS Visła Bydgoszcz players
Halkbank volleyball players
BBTS Bielsko-Biała coaches
GKS Katowice (volleyball) coaches
Resovia (volleyball) coaches
Outside hitters
Opposite hitters